Ravela Venkatrao served as the Member of the Legislative Assembly for Sattenapalli constituency in Andhra Pradesh, India, between 1978 and 1983. He represented the INC (I).

References

Year of birth missing
Possibly living people
Andhra Pradesh MLAs 1978–1983
Indian National Congress politicians from Andhra Pradesh
People from Guntur district